In mathematics, and in particular universal algebra, the concept of an n-ary group (also called n-group or multiary group) is a generalization of the concept of a group to a set G with an n-ary operation instead of a binary operation.   By an  operation is meant any map f: Gn → G from the n-th Cartesian power of G to G.  The axioms for an  group are defined in such a way that they reduce to those of a group in the case .  The earliest work on these structures was done in 1904 by Kasner and in 1928 by Dörnte; the first systematic account of (what were then called) polyadic groups was given in 1940 by Emil Leon Post in a famous 143-page paper in the Transactions of the American Mathematical Society.

Axioms

Associativity
The easiest axiom to generalize is the associative law. Ternary associativity is the polynomial identity , i.e. the equality of the three possible bracketings of the string abcde in which any three consecutive symbols are bracketed. (Here it is understood that the equations hold for arbitrary choices of elements a,b,c,d,e in G.)  In general,  associativity is the equality of the n possible bracketings of a string consisting of  distinct symbols with any n consecutive  symbols bracketed.  A set G which is closed under an associative  operation is called an n-ary semigroup. A set G which is closed under any (not necessarily associative)  operation is called an n-ary groupoid.

Inverses / unique solutions
The inverse axiom is generalized as follows: in the case of binary operations the existence of an inverse means  has a unique solution for x, and likewise  has a unique solution.

Definition of n-ary group
An n-ary group is an  semigroup which is also an  quasigroup.

Identity / neutral elements
In the  case, there can be zero or one identity elements: the empty set is a 2-ary group, since the empty set is both a semigroup and a quasigroup, and every inhabited 2-ary group is a group. In  groups for n ≥ 3 there can be zero, one, or many identity elements.

In 1928 Dörnte  published the first main results: An  groupoid which is reducible is an  group, however for all n > 2 there exist inhabited  groups which are not reducible. In some n-ary groups there exists an element e (called an  identity or neutral element) such that any string of n-elements consisting of all e's, apart from one place, is mapped to the element at that place. E.g., in a quaternary group with identity e, eeae = a for every a.

An  group containing a neutral element is reducible. Thus, an  group that is not reducible does not contain such elements. There exist  groups with more than one neutral element. If the set of all neutral elements of an  group is non-empty it forms an  subgroup.

Some authors include an identity in the definition of an  group but as mentioned above such  operations are just repeated binary operations. Groups with intrinsically  operations do not have an identity element.

Weaker axioms

The axioms of associativity and unique solutions in the definition of an  group are stronger than they need to be. Under the assumption of  associativity it suffices to postulate the existence of the solution of equations with the unknown at the start or end of the string, or at one place other than the ends; e.g., in the  case, xabcde = f and abcdex = f, or an expression like abxcde = f. Then it can be proved that the equation has a unique solution for x in any place in the string.
The associativity axiom can also be given in a weaker form.

Example
The following is an example of a three element ternary group, one of four such groups

(n,m)-group

The concept of an n-ary group can be further generalized to that of an (n,m)-group, also known as a vector valued group, which is a set G with a map f: Gn → Gm where n > m, subject to similar axioms as for an n-ary group except that the result of the map is a word consisting of m letters instead of a single letter.

See also
Universal algebra

References

Further reading
 S. A. Rusakov: Some applications of n-ary group theory, (Russian), Belaruskaya navuka, Minsk 1998.

Algebraic structures